Benn Trevor Ferriero (born April 29, 1987) is an American former professional ice hockey center. He played in the National Hockey League (NHL) with the San Jose Sharks, New York Rangers and the Vancouver Canucks. Ferriero was born in Boston, Massachusetts, but grew up in Essex, Mass.

Playing career

Amateur
As a youth, Ferriero played in the 2001 Quebec International Pee-Wee Hockey Tournament with the Middlesex Islanders minor ice hockey team.

Ferriero attended high school at Governor Dummer Academy in Byfield, Massachusetts, graduating in 2005. He played collegiate hockey at Boston College for four seasons from 2005 to 2009. After scoring 25 points in 42 games in his freshman season, Ferriero was drafted in the seventh round of the 2006 NHL Entry Draft, 196th overall by the Phoenix Coyotes. However, the Coyotes did not sign Ferriero upon completing his college career.

Professional
Ferriero was signed as a free agent by the San Jose Sharks on September 1, 2009. After a pre-season during which he scored five points, Ferriero made his NHL debut exactly one month later against the Colorado Avalanche. He scored his first NHL goal during the second game of the season on October 3 against Jonas Hiller of the Anaheim Ducks.

On his 24th birthday, and in his first Stanley Cup playoff appearance, Ferriero scored the game-winning goal (and his first career playoff goal) in overtime against the Detroit Red Wings in Game 1 of the Western Conference Semifinals of the 2011 playoffs.

On July 13, 2012, the Pittsburgh Penguins signed Ferriero to a one-year, two-way contract. Due to the 2012–13 NHL lockout, however, Ferriero was directly assigned to the team's American Hockey League (AHL) affiliate, the Wilkes-Barre/Scranton Penguins, to start the 2012–13 season. On January 24, 2013, Ferriero was traded from the Penguins to the New York Rangers in exchange for Chad Kolarik. He was later recalled from the Connecticut Whale and appeared in four games for the Rangers.

On June 30, 2013, Ferriero's rights were traded by the Rangers to the Minnesota Wild in exchange for Justin Falk. It was later announced that the Wild would not tender Ferriero a contract, releasing him as a free agent.

On July 11, 2013, Ferriero was signed to a one-year contract by the Vancouver Canucks. Ferriero spent the majority of the 2013–14 season, with the Canucks' AHL affiliate, the Utica Comets, before appearing in two games with Vancouver.

On July 16, 2014, Ferriero was signed as a free agent to a one-year, two-way contract by the St. Louis Blues. He was assigned to their AHL affiliate, the Chicago Wolves, for the duration of the 2014–15 season.

Ferriero left the NHL in the off-season, signing a one-year contract with Austrian club EC Red Bull Salzburg of the Austrian Hockey League (EBEL) on June 9, 2015. After 23 appearances for Salzburg, Ferriero opted to return to North America, signing a professional try-out with hometown club, the Providence Bruins of the AHL on December 17, 2016.

International play
Ferriero earned a gold medal as part of the United States team at the 2005 IIHF World U18 Championships in the Czech Republic.

Personal life
In the 2010 NHL Entry Draft, the Sharks drafted Benn's younger brother Cody in the fifth round, 127th overall.

Career statistics

Regular season and playoffs

International

Awards and honors

References

External links

Hockey's Future prospect profile

1987 births
Living people
American men's ice hockey centers
Arizona Coyotes draft picks
Boston College Eagles men's ice hockey players
Chicago Wolves players
Connecticut Whale (AHL) players
Ice hockey players from Massachusetts
New York Rangers players
People from Essex, Massachusetts
Providence Bruins players
EC Red Bull Salzburg players
San Jose Sharks players
Sportspeople from Essex County, Massachusetts
Utica Comets players
Vancouver Canucks players
Worcester Sharks players
Wilkes-Barre/Scranton Penguins players
The Governor's Academy alumni